Kleren Maken de Man  is a 1957 Dutch comedy film directed by Georg Jacoby.

Cast
Kees Brusse	... 	Verzekeringsagent Hans
Annet Nieuwenhuyzen	... 	Ellen
Mimi Boesnach	... 	Burgerjuffrouw
Andrea Domburg	... 	Voormalige vriendin Peter
Johan Kaart	... 	Speurder
Rijk de Gooyer	... 	Peter
Guus Oster		
Jan Retèl		
Cees Laseur		
Cruys Voorbergh		
Hans Tiemeyer		
Leo de Hartogh

External links 
 

1957 films
Dutch black-and-white films
1957 comedy films
Dutch comedy films
1950s Dutch-language films